The discography of the Geto Boys contains seven studio albums, one remix album, three compilations and four charting singles. Geto Boys (originally spelled Ghetto Boys) is a hip-hop group located in Houston, Texas that started off with the members Raheem, Prince Johnny C and Sire Jukebox but ended up releasing their debut album in 1988, Making Trouble, with Prince Johnny C, Sire Jukebox, DJ Ready Red and Bushwick Bill as members. After failing commercially and critically, the group's line-up was changed around by removing Johnny C and Sire Jukebox but replacing them with Willie D and Scarface. This line-up released Grip It! On That Other Level and since then has become the most familiar Geto Boys line-up. Rapper Big Mike was also a member of the group at one point, for the album Till Death Do Us Part.

Studio albums

Compilations

Remix

Singles

Music videos

Notes

References

Hip hop discographies
Discographies of American artists